Line Bus is a 1971 Indian Malayalam film, directed by K. S. Sethumadhavan and produced by C. C. Baby. The film stars Madhu, Jayabharathi, Adoor Bhasi and Prameela in the lead roles. The film had musical score by G. Devarajan.

Cast

Madhu as Gopi
Jayabharathi as Sarasamma
Adoor Bhasi as Govindhan Pilla
Meena as Pankiyamma
Bahadoor as Vareed
Alummoodan as Chacko
Prameela as Priyamma
Dinachandran
Jameela Malik
Khadeeja as Kathreena
 K.P. Ummer as Chandrasenan

Soundtrack
The music was composed by G. Devarajan and the lyrics were written by Vayalar Ramavarma.

References

External links
 

1971 films
1970s Malayalam-language films
Films directed by K. S. Sethumadhavan